Fabrício dos Santos Camões (born December 23, 1978) is a Brazilian mixed martial artist, who formerly competed in the Lightweight division of the Ultimate Fighting Championship. Camões's primary style in the cage is Brazilian Jiu Jitsu, Camões is a 3rd degree black belt in Brazilian Jiu Jitsu under Royler Gracie.

Early life

Camões was born December 23, 1978 in Rio de Janeiro, Brazil. According to Jorge Britto, when Camões was 18 years old, he lasted 27 minutes in a bout with former UFC middleweight champion Anderson Silva, who was 22.

His Portuguese nickname Morangò, which translates into Strawberry, originated from Camões's love for a local Strawberry flavored yogurt drink while Camões was a young child living in Brazil. 

When he was 16, Camões constantly witnessed the late Hélio Gracie still practicing Brazilian Jiu Jitsu in his 90s.

Mixed martial arts career

Ultimate Fighting Championship

Camões signed a four fight contract with the Ultimate Fighting Championship and made his UFC debut at UFC 106 against veteran Caol Uno, with the fight ending in a draw after a point was deducted in the 2nd round against Camões for an illegal upkick. 

In his next UFC bout on March 27, 2010, at UFC 111 Camões fought Kurt Pellegrino. A fight that saw both Camões and Pellegrino grappling back and forth, ultimately a visibly exhausted Camões succumbed to a rear naked choke late in the second round. Following the loss to Pellegrino, Camões was released from the UFC with a record of 0-1-1.

Post-UFC career

Following his release from the UFC, Camões signed with Tachi Palace Fights. He fought fellow UFC veteran Steve Lopez on February 18, 2011 and won via devastating head kick KO in the first round.

Camões next fought on May 5, 2011 at Tachi Palace Fights 9 against fellow UFC veteran Efrain Escudero. He won the fight via unanimous decision.

Return to UFC
After winning his last two fights since being released from the UFC, Camões was expected to face Reza Madadi on January 20, 2012 at UFC on FX 1, replacing an injured Rafaello Oliveira. However, Madadi himself would later withdraw from the bout due to injury as well and was replaced by promotional newcomer Tommy Hayden. Camões won the fight via submission in the first round.

Camões next lost to Melvin Guillard by unanimous decision on July 7, 2012 at UFC 148.

Camões faced Jim Miller on December 28, 2013 at UFC 168. He lost the fight via submission in the first round.

Camões was expected to face Gray Maynard on August 2, 2014 at UFC 176. However, after the event was cancelled, the bout was rescheduled for UFC Fight Night 47 on August 16, 2014. In turn, Maynard filled in as an injury replacement for another bout on the card and Camões was pulled from the event entirely.

Camões was expected to face Josh Shockley on October 25, 2014 at UFC 179.  However, Shockley pulled out of the bout citing injury and was replaced by Anthony Rocco Martin. Both Camões and Martin missed weight for the bout, but neither were issued a fine. Camões lost the fight via submission in the first round, and was subsequently released from the promotion for the second time in his career.

Mixed martial arts record

|-
| Loss
| align=center| 14–9–1
| Anthony Rocco Martin
| Submission (kimura)
| UFC 179
| 
| align=center| 1
| align=center| 4:16
| Rio de Janeiro, Brazil
| 
|-
| Loss
| align=center| 14–8–1
| Jim Miller
| Submission (armbar)
| UFC 168
| 
| align=center| 1
| align=center| 3:42
| Las Vegas, Nevada, United States
| 
|-
| Loss
| align=center| 14–7–1
| Melvin Guillard
| Decision (unanimous)
| UFC 148
| 
| align=center| 3
| align=center| 5:00
| Las Vegas, Nevada, United States
| 
|-
| Win
| align=center| 14–6–1
| Tommy Hayden
| Submission (rear-naked choke)
| UFC on FX: Guillard vs. Miller
| 
| align=center| 1
| align=center| 4:03
| Nashville, Tennessee, United States
| 
|-
| Win
| align=center| 13–6–1
| Efrain Escudero
| Decision (unanimous)
| TPF 9: The Contenders
| 
| align=center| 3
| align=center| 5:00
| Lemoore, California, United States
| 
|-
| Win
| align=center| 12–6–1
| Steve Lopez
| KO (head kick and punches)
| TPF 8: All or Nothing
| 
| align=center| 1
| align=center| 0:23
| Lemoore, California, United States
| 
|-
| Loss
| align=center| 11–6–1
| Kurt Pellegrino
| Submission (rear-naked choke)
| UFC 111
| 
| align=center| 2
| align=center| 4:20
| Newark, New Jersey, United States
| 
|-
| Draw
| align=center| 11–5–1
| Caol Uno
| Draw (majority)
| UFC 106
| 
| align=center| 3
| align=center| 5:00
| Las Vegas, Nevada, United States
| 
|-
| Win
| align=center| 11–5
| Torrance Taylor
| Submission (rear-naked choke)
| Strikeforce Challengers: Evangelista vs. Aina
| 
| align=center| 1
| align=center| 3:21
| Fresno, California, United States
| 
|-
| Win
| align=center| 10–5
| Sam Morgan
| Submission (rear-naked choke)
| ShoXC: Hamman vs. Suganuma 2
| 
| align=center| 1
| align=center| 0:47
| Friant, California, United States
| 
|-
| Win
| align=center| 9–5
| Joe Camacho
| KO (punches)
| ShoXC: Elite Challenger Series
| 
| align=center| 1
| align=center| 3:20
| Friant, California, United States
| 
|-
| Win
| align=center| 8–5
| Jean Silva
| Submission (armbar)
| Super Challenge 1
| 
| align=center| 1
| align=center| 2:10
| Barueri, Brazil
| 
|-
| Win
| align=center| 7–5
| Luciano Azevedo
| Decision (unanimous)
| Super Challenge 1
| 
| align=center| 2
| align=center| 5:00
| Barueri, Brazil
| 
|-
| Win
| align=center| 6–5
| Mauro Chimento Jr.
| Submission (guillotine choke)
| Super Challenge 1
| 
| align=center| 1
| align=center| 2:00
| Barueri, Brazil
| 
|-
| Win
| align=center| 5–5
| Epitacio Silva
| Submission (gogoplata)
| Iron Fight 2
| 
| align=center| 1
| align=center| 2:02
| Rio de Janeiro, Brazil
| 
|-
| Loss
| align=center| 4–5
| Luiz Dutra Jr.
| Decision (unanimous)
| Gold Fighters Championship 1
| 
| align=center| 3
| align=center| 5:00
| Rio de Janeiro, Brazil
| 
|-
| Loss
| align=center| 4–4
| Gleison Tibau
| Submission (rear-naked choke)
| Meca World Vale Tudo 12
| 
| align=center| 1
| align=center| 2:15
| Rio de Janeiro, Brazil
| 
|-
| Win
| align=center| 4–3
| Vitelmo Kubis Bandeira
| Decision (unanimous)
| Storm Samurai 6
| 
| align=center| 3
| align=center| 5:00
| Curitiba, Brazil
| 
|-
| Loss
| align=center| 3–3
| Luiz Dutra Jr.
| Submission (knee injury)
| Meca World Vale Tudo 10
| 
| align=center| 1
| align=center| 1:50
| Porto Alegre, Brazil
| 
|-
| Win
| align=center| 3–2
| Marcello Rodriguez
| Submission (smother choke)
| Sul Combat 1
| 
| align=center| 1
| align=center| N/A
| Porto Alegre, Brazil
| 
|-
| Win
| align=center| 2–2
| Wagner Tulio
| TKO (punches)
| Meca World Vale Tudo 8
| 
| align=center| 1
| align=center| 1:40
| Curitiba, Brazil
| 
|-
| Loss
| align=center| 1–2
| Luiz Azeredo
| TKO (punches)
| Meca World Vale Tudo 3
| 
| align=center| 2
| align=center| 1:36
| Curitiba, Brazil
| 
|-
| Loss
| align=center| 1–1
| Anderson Silva
| TKO (retirement)
| Brazilian Freestyle Circuit 1	
| 
| align=center| 1
| align=center| 25:14
| Campo Grande, Brazil
| 
|-
| Win
| align=center| 1–0
| Eliezer Ninja
| TKO (punches)
| Brazilian Freestyle Circuit 1
| 
| align=center| 1
| align=center| 4:55
| Campo Grande, Brazil
|

References

External links

 
 The Arena MMA

1978 births
Living people
Brazilian practitioners of Brazilian jiu-jitsu
Brazilian male mixed martial artists
Lightweight mixed martial artists
Mixed martial artists utilizing Brazilian jiu-jitsu
Sportspeople from Rio de Janeiro (city)
Brazilian expatriate sportspeople in the United States
People awarded a black belt in Brazilian jiu-jitsu
Ultimate Fighting Championship male fighters